Keith Schraad (born March 14, 1961) is an American politician. He served two years in the Kansas State Senate in 1997 and 1998, where he was the vice-chair of the Judiciary Committee.

After his time in the Senate, Schraad left Kansas and moved to Arizona, where he founded a company called Online Insurance Company from 2008 to 2015. In 2018, he was appointed interim director of the Arizona Department of Insurance by Governor Doug Ducey. He has also worked as the vice president of Blue Cross Blue Shield of Arizona.

References

Republican Party Kansas state senators
Politicians from Overland Park, Kansas
Washburn University School of Law alumni
University of Kansas alumni
20th-century American politicians
Businesspeople from Arizona
1961 births
Living people